Alto Alegre is a municipality in the Brazilian state of São Paulo. The population is 4,088 (2020 est.) in an area of 319 km².

References

Municipalities in São Paulo (state)